Terence Cooper (born 11 March 1950) is a Welsh former professional footballer who played as a central defender.

Career
Born in Croesyceiliog, Cooper made 434 appearances in the English Football League for Newport County, Notts County, Lincoln City, Scunthorpe United, Bradford City and Rochdale.

References

1950 births
Living people
Welsh footballers
Newport County A.F.C. players
Notts County F.C. players
Lincoln City F.C. players
Scunthorpe United F.C. players
Bradford City A.F.C. players
Rochdale A.F.C. players
English Football League players
Association football defenders